Oksana Kiselyova (born 30 May 1992, in Baku, Azerbaijan) is an Azerbaijani volleyball player. She is 177 cm tall and plays as libero. She plays for Lokomotiv Baku.

Kiselyova is a current member of the Azerbaijan women's national volleyball team. Kiselyova is married to Azerbaijani football player Farid Guliyev.

Clubs
Kiselyova has played for the following clubs, all in Azerbaijan:
 Azerrail Baku (2006–2012, 2013-2014)
 Azeryol Baku (2012–2013)
 Lokomotiv Baku (2014–)

Awards

Club
 2006–07 Azerbaijan Women's Volleyball Super League -  Champion, with Azerrail Baku
 2007–08 Azerbaijan Women's Volleyball Super League -  Champion, with Azerrail Baku
 2008–09 Azerbaijan Women's Volleyball Super League -  Runner-Up, with Azerrail Baku
 2010–11 Azerbaijan Women's Volleyball Super League -  Runner-Up, with Azerrail Baku
 2014–15 Azerbaijan Women's Volleyball Super League -  Runner-Up, with Lokomotiv Baku

References

External links
 

1992 births
Living people
Sportspeople from Baku
Azerbaijani women's volleyball players
European Games competitors for Azerbaijan
Volleyball players at the 2015 European Games
Liberos
Azerbaijani people of Russian descent
21st-century Azerbaijani women